Duncan Michael Pugh (2 December 1974 – 25 January 2023) was an Australian bobsledder.

Early life
Pugh was born in Great Britain. He attended Edith Cowan University in Perth, Western Australia.

Career
Pugh started as a hurdler before being introduced to bobsleigh and debuting on the international circuit in 2007 at the age of 32. He won bronze at the 2009 America's Cup in Canada with Christopher Spring. He then qualified for the 2010 Vancouver Games but was knocked out in the first round when he and pilot Jeremy Rolleston's sled flipped over and saw them slide down the course upside-down.

Personal life
Pugh taught at Newman College in Perth for 17 years. He was also a surf lifesaver and a volunteer rugby coach at Wests Scarborough Rugby Union Club.

Pugh and his wife McKenzie had two sons.

Death
On 24 January 2023, Pugh suffered a brain aneurysm in his hometown, Perth. He died the following day at the age of 48.

References

External links
 

1974 births
2023 deaths
Australian male bobsledders
Bobsledders at the 2010 Winter Olympics
Olympic bobsledders of Australia
21st-century Australian people